Cobalt-precorrin-5B (C1)-methyltransferase, cobalt-precorrin-6A synthase, CbiD (gene)) is an enzyme with systematic name S-adenosyl-L-methionine:cobalt-precorrin-5B (C1)-methyltransferase. This enzyme catalyses the following chemical reaction

 cobalt-precorrin-5B + S-adenosyl-L-methionine  cobalt-precorrin-6A + S-adenosyl-L-homocysteine

This enzyme catalyses the C-1 methylation of cobalt-precorrin-5B in the anaerobic pathway of adenosylcobalamin biosynthesis in bacteria such as Salmonella typhimurium, Bacillus megaterium, and Propionibacterium freudenreichii subsp. shermanii.

See also
 Cobalamin biosynthesis

References

External links 

EC 2.1.1